Sukhodol is a rural locality (a selo) in Pavlovskoye Rural Settlement, Suzdalsky District, Vladimir Oblast, Russia. The population was 303 as of 2010. There are 15 streets.

Geography 
Sukhodol is located 26 km south of Suzdal (the district's administrative centre) by road. Suromna is the nearest rural locality.

References 

Rural localities in Suzdalsky District
Vladimirsky Uyezd